John Benedict Steele (March 28, 1814 – September 24, 1866) was an American lawyer and politician who served one term as a U.S. Representative from New York during the American Civil War.

Biography
Born in Delhi, New York, Steele attended Delaware Academy at Delhi and attended Williams College, Williamstown, Massachusetts, but left before graduating to study law in Delhi with Amasa Parker and Amasa J. Parker.

He completed his studied with Abraham Becker of Worcester, New York, was admitted to the bar of Otsego County in 1839 and commenced practice in Oneonta, New York.

He served as district attorney of Otsego County from 1841 until he moved to Kingston in 1847. In Kingston, he formed a partnership with General George H. Sharpe.

Congress 
Steele was elected special judge of Ulster County in 1850 and in 1860 as a Democrat. He was then reelected to the Thirty-seventh and Thirty-eighth Congresses serving from (March 4, 1861 – March 3, 1865).

He served on committees on the District of Columbia, Revolutionary Pensions and the Pacific Railroad. He was an unsuccessful candidate for renomination in 1864 to the Thirty-ninth Congress.

Death 
He was again a candidate for the nomination in 1866, but died on the eve of the primary, when he died in an accident in Rondout, near Kingston, New York, on September 24, 1866. While descending Hone Street, his horse was startled, crashing his carriage against an awning post, against which Steele was thrown before falling to the ground. He suffered a cracked skull, broken ribs and other internal injuries and died later that day. He was interred in Wiltwyck Cemetery, Kingston, New York.

References

 Retrieved on 2009-5-12

External links

1814 births
1866 deaths
Williams College alumni
New York (state) lawyers
People from Delhi, New York
Politicians from Kingston, New York
People of New York (state) in the American Civil War
Democratic Party members of the United States House of Representatives from New York (state)
People from Cooperstown, New York
19th-century American politicians
19th-century American lawyers